Pagno is a comune (municipality) in the Province of Cuneo in the Italian region of Piedmont.

Pagno borders the municipalities of Brondello, Manta, Piasco, Revello, Saluzzo, Venasca, and Verzuolo.

Demographic evolution

References

Cities and towns in Piedmont